German submarine U-237 was a Type VIIC U-boat of Nazi Germany's Kriegsmarine during World War II.

The submarine was laid down on 23 April 1942 at the Friedrich Krupp Germaniawerft yard at Kiel as yard number 667, launched on 17 December and commissioned on 30 January 1943 under the command of Oberleutnant zur See Hubert Nordheimer. After training with the 5th U-boat Flotilla at Kiel, she went to the 23rd flotilla as a trials boat and then to the 31st flotilla. She was sunk by American bombs at the Germaniawerft in Kiel during a raid on 14 May 1943, but was raised, repaired and returned to service. She was sunk a second time by British bombs at the Deutsche Werke in Kiel on 4 April 1945.

Design
German Type VIIC submarines were preceded by the shorter Type VIIB submarines. U-237 had a displacement of  when at the surface and  while submerged. She had two shafts and two  propellers.

U-237 was fitted with five  torpedo tubes (four fitted at the bow and one at the stern), fourteen torpedoes, one  SK C/35 naval gun, 220 rounds, and a  C/30 anti-aircraft gun. The boat had a complement of between forty-four and sixty.

References

Bibliography

External links

German Type VIIC submarines
World War II submarines of Germany
U-boats commissioned in 1943
U-boats sunk in 1943
U-boats sunk in 1945
U-boats sunk by British aircraft
1942 ships
Ships built in Kiel
Maritime incidents in May 1943
Maritime incidents in April 1945